The 1937 FIBA European Championship, commonly called FIBA EuroBasket 1937, was the second FIBA EuroBasket regional basketball championship, held by FIBA. Eight national teams affiliated with the International Basketball Federation (FIBA) took part in the competition.  Defending champions Latvia hosted the tournament, held in Riga.

Results

First round

The preliminary round consisted of the eight teams being separated into two groups of four.  Each group played a round-robin format tournament, with the top two teams in each group advancing to the semifinals and the bottom two playing in the lower classification matches.  Wins counted for 2 points, losses for 1 point.

Group A

 

Note: Egypt originally won against Italy 31–28, but due to a referee's error, FIBA declared the game null and void, and ordered a replay. Egypt objected to the ruling and did not appear for the replay before withdrawing from the tournament.

Group B

Latvia are classified third, because of scores differences between France-Poland-Latvia (Latvia has −4, Poland +2 and France +2).

Classification 5–8
The bottom four teams from the preliminary group faced off in the classification matches.

Classification semifinals

7th/8th playoff

5th/6th playoff

Semifinals
The semifinals pitted the four top teams of the preliminary round against each other.  Winners advanced to the final, with the losers playing in a match for 3rd and 4th place.

Bronze medal match

Final

Final standings

Team rosters
1. Lithuania: Feliksas Kriaučiūnas, Pranas Talzūnas, Stasys Šačkus, Juozas Žukas, Leonas Baltrūnas, Zenonas Puzinauskas, Artūras Andrulis, Leopoldas Kepalas, Pranas Mažeika, Česlovas Daukša, Leonas Petrauskas, Eugenijus Nikolskis (Coach: Feliksas Kriaučiūnas)

2. Italy: Livio Franceschini, Ambrogio Bessi, Galeazzo Dondi, Emilio Giassetti, Giancarlo Marinelli, Camillo Marinone, Sergio Paganella, Mino Pasquini, Michele Pelliccia, Ezio Varisco

3. France: Pierre Boel, Robert Cohu, Jacques Flouret, Henri Hell, Edmond Leclere, Henri Lesmayoux, Fernand Prudhomme, Etienne Roland, Eugene Ronner, Marcel Vérot (Coach: Henri Kretzschmar)

4. Poland: Pawel Stok, Michal Czajczyk, Stefan Gendera, Florian Grzechowiak, Zdzislaw Kasprzak, Janusz Patrzykont, Andrzej Plucinski, Zbigniew Resich, Zenon Rozycki, Jaroslaw Smigielski (Coach: Walenty Kłyszejko)

5. Estonia: Heino Veskila, Oskar Erikson, Evald Mahl, Vladimir Kärk, Robert Keres, Aleksander Illi, Alfred Zimmermann, Albert Suurna, Ralf Viksten (Coach: Herbert Niiler)

External links
FIBA Europe EuroBasket 1937
Eurobasket.com 1937 EChampionship
(Video of the opening ceremony)

1937
1937 in basketball
1937 in Latvian sport
International basketball competitions hosted by Latvia
Sports competitions in Riga
May 1937 sports events
1930s in Riga